During the 2006–07 English football season, Charlton Athletic competed in the FA Premier League.

Season summary
Following Alan Curbishley's resignation after 10 years in charge of the Addicks, Northern Irishman Iain Dowie was snared from South London rivals Crystal Palace who were relegated in the previous season, but, despite being given more money to spend in the transfer market than any other previous Charlton manager, the club were in the relegation zone for most of his tenure and he was sacked in November. First-team coach Les Reed stepped into the breach, but also proved unsuitable for the job and was in turn replaced by former West Ham United manager Alan Pardew. Pardew was unable to stop the rot and after seven years in the top-flight, Charlton were relegated.

Final league table

Kit
Charlton retained their kit manufacturing deal with Spanish apparel manufacturers Joma, who produced a new kit for the season. The kit sponsorship deal with Spanish real estate company Llanera.

Players

First-team squad
Squad at end of season

Left club during season

Reserve squad
The following players did not appear for the first team this season.

Trialists

Statistics

Appearances and goals

|-
! colspan=14 style=background:#dcdcdc; text-align:center| Goalkeepers

|-
! colspan=14 style=background:#dcdcdc; text-align:center| Defenders

|-
! colspan=14 style=background:#dcdcdc; text-align:center| Midfielders

|-
! colspan=14 style=background:#dcdcdc; text-align:center| Forwards

|-
! colspan=14 style=background:#dcdcdc; text-align:center| Players transferred out during the season

Starting 11
Considering starts in all competitions
 GK: #38,  Scott Carson, 38
 RB: #2,  Luke Young, 32
 CB: #15,  Talal El Karkouri, 39
 CB: #23,  Souleymane Diawara, 20
 LB: #3,  Hermann Hreiðarsson, 32
 RM: #19,  Dennis Rommedahl, 22
 CM: #8,  Matt Holland, 29
 CM: #4,  Amdy Faye, 28
 LM: #11,  Darren Ambrose, 23
 CF: #10,  Darren Bent, 34
 CF: #7,  Marcus Bent, 22

Transfers

In
  Cory Gibbs -  Feyenoord, 8 May, free
  Jimmy Floyd Hasselbaink -  Middlesbrough, 11 July, free
  Djimi Traoré -  Liverpool, 8 August, £2,000,000
  Amdy Faye -  Newcastle United, 8 August, £2,000,000
  Scott Carson -  Liverpool, 14 August, season-long loan
  Andy Reid -  Tottenham Hotspur, 16 August, £3,000,000
  Souleymane Diawara -  Sochaux, 31 August, £3,700,000
  Zheng Zhi -  Shandong Luneng Taishan, 29 December, season-long loan
  Ben Thatcher -  Manchester City, 11 January, £500,000 (rising to £750,000)
  Madjid Bougherra -  Sheffield Wednesday, 28 January, £2,500,000
  Alex Song -  Arsenal, 30 January, season-long loan

Out
  Chris Powell -  Watford, 1 July, free
  Francis Jeffers -  Blackburn Rovers, 3 July, free
  Chris Perry -  West Bromwich Albion, 4 July, free
  Jay Bothroyd -  Wolverhampton Wanderers, 26 July, free
  Jason Euell -  Middlesbrough, 31 August, £300,000
  Djimi Traoré -  Portsmouth, 13 January, £1,000,000
  Shaun Bartlett -  Kaizer Chiefs, free

Transfers in:  £13,700,000
Transfers out:  £1,300,000
Total spending:  £12,400,000

Results

Results per matchday

Premier League

FA Cup

League Cup

References

Notes

Charlton Athletic F.C. seasons
Charlton Athletic